Bonds Hollow is a valley in Oregon County in the U.S. state of Missouri.

Bonds Hollow has the name of an early citizen.

References

Valleys of Oregon County, Missouri
Valleys of Missouri